Leon Pichay (June 27, 1902 – August 11, 1970) was a writer and poet from the Philippines. Pichay was one of the most active Ilocano writers of his time. He wrote short stories, plays, novels, essays and more than 400 poems. He was known as the King of Ilocano Poets during the 50s.

He was born on June 27, 1902 in Vigan, Ilocos Sur. He studied law at the University of Manila. During his studies he wrote many poems and worked for various Ilocano newspapers, including being an associate writer for the Ilocano Times. Other publications include Panagbiag, Timekmi, Ti Agipaawat, Wagayway, Heraldo Ilocano, El Norte, and Naimbag a Damag. He also became members of societies such as Filipino Editors and Publishers Union (as editor) and of Romanceros Nacionales (as secretary-general). Eventually he was not able to complete his study.

Pichay was a versatile and active writer, and he wrote short stories, plays, novels, essays and hundreds of poems. Although he was educated in English, he chose to write in his native language Ilocano, and thus contributed to the development of Ilocano literature. He was also one of the initiators of bukanegan, the Ilocano counterpart of balagtasan, and was granted the title Prince of Bukanegan. He was very popular with the people. For example, many sound recordings of his poems were sold just before the Second World War, and he gave recitals of poems during the celebration of the winners of the election as the highlight of the annual fiesta.

His poems had themes such as patriotism, spirituality, and love. He also wrote about Filipino heroes like José Rizal and  Antonio Luna. Some examples of his work are: Kailukoan (Ilocos), about his people the Ilocanos; Ni Kaingungotko (My Beloved); Nena A Naig Kararuak (Nena, Joy of My Soul), which he wrote for his wife Filomena Oasan; Ayatenka Uray Ulpitannak (I Love You Despite Your Cruelty); Pinaan Ni Ulila (Have Pity on the Poor Orphan), O Apo Jesucristo Nga Ari (O, Christ, the Lord), a religious poem; and Ti Dilak (My Mother Tongue), a patriotic poem written for his love for the Ilocano language and his conviction that as a writer one should use the mother tongue.

He died on August 11, 1970. An award was named after him by the Gunglo Dagiti Mannurat nga Ilokano (GUMIL) as a memorial to his contribution to Ilocano literature. A historical marker was granted to him by the National Historical Institute (now National Historical Commission of the Philippines) in 1983 in his hometown of Vigan.

References

 Carlos Quirino, Who's who in Philippine history, Tahanan Books, Manila (1995)

1902 births
1970 deaths
Filipino poets
People from Vigan